Home and Away is an Australian television soap opera. It was first broadcast on the Seven Network on 17 January 1988. The following is a list of characters that appeared in 2015, by order of first appearance. All characters were introduced by the soap's executive producer, Lucy Addario. The 28th season of Home and Away began airing from 2 February 2015. Katarina Chapman and Ryan Kelly were introduced in the same month. Martin Ashford's sister, Billie Ashford arrived in April, while Charlotte King made her first appearance in June. James Edmunds and Charlotte's teenage son Hunter King made their debuts in July. September saw the arrival of Tank Snelgrove, while Trystan Powell was introduced in October. Skye Peters made her first appearance in November.

Katarina Chapman

Katarina "Kat" Chapman, played by Pia Miller, made her first screen appearance on 5 February 2015. The character and Miller's casting was announced on 4 August 2014. Miller auditioned for the role two weeks before the announcement and she began filming from 5 August. Of joining Home and Away, Miller said "I'm feeling very excited, it just feels like it's been such a whirlwind." Kat moves to Summer Bay from the city and she was described as being "tough and resilient". Kat is a policewoman and Miller explained that her character was there "to enforce the law and help people", instead of being a "sex symbol". The actress added that Kat "has been through a bit and had experiences - some good and some not so great". For her portrayal of Kat, Miller earned a nomination for the Logie Award for Best New Talent in 2016.

Ryan Kelly

Ryan Kelly, played by Daniel Webber, made his first screen appearance on 17 February 2015. Webber is the real-life flatmate of Nic Westaway, who plays Kyle Braxton. After being cast as Ryan, he told Westaway that he would be stalking his on-screen girlfriend Phoebe Nicholson (Isabella Giovinazzo). Westaway recalled "He said, 'I'm stalking your girlfriend'. Then he added, 'on the show'." Stephen Downie branded Ryan "a mysterious peeping Tom" and added "we get the vibe he doesn't seem like the sort of guy who'll settle for an autograph."

After arriving in Summer Bay, Ryan goes to the diner and tells Roo Stewart (Georgie Parker) that he is in the Bay to meet a girl. He spots Phoebe Nicholson and tells Roo that he is a fan of hers. He follows Phoebe home and watches her from the bushes. Ryan talks to her the following day and is spotted by John Palmer (Shane Withington) looking through the window of her house. Ryan sees Phoebe's boyfriend Kyle Braxton leave town and later shows up at her house, telling Phoebe he knows she is alone. Phoebe tries to get Ryan to leave, but he tells her he wants to help as she is not safe. Phoebe's screams alert John and Ryan leaves. The following day, Ryan is questioned by Katarina Chapman (Pia Miller) and told to stay away from Phoebe, who also gets an AVO. Phoebe's boyfriend, Kyle, and Ash (George Mason) threaten Ryan. After learning the Braxton house is empty, Ryan breaks in and plants a camera in Phoebe's bedroom. He later returns and kidnaps Phoebe. He forces her to wear a white dress and he cleans the make-up off her face, telling her he preferred her previous image and music. Ryan asks Phoebe to sing "Amazing Grace" and during the performance, Phoebe kicks him in the groin and manages to open the door, where Kyle is waiting. Ryan is then arrested by Katarina. She later informs Phoebe that Ryan pleaded guilty to stalking and kidnap, and he is being held in a psychiatric facility.

Billie Ashford

Billie Ashford, played by Tessa de Josselin, made her first screen appearance on 27 April 2015. Details about her casting and character were released on 21 April 2015. Of joining the cast, De Josselin said "I was super chuffed. No doubt there was a huge grin on my face for the rest of the week. It's a cool thing when hard work pays off and you know you've been given an opportunity to do what you love." Billie is the younger sister of Martin Ashford (George Mason), who tried to track her down after he was released from prison. Mason commented, "Billie is the only family Ash has left, and he feels they need to make amends now he's out of jail." Describing Billie, de Josselin said "Billie's super upfront and sometimes lacks a social filter." Billie and Ash were reunited at their brother Luke's graveside on Anzac Day. The character was killed off on the 15 February 2017.

Charlotte King

Charlotte King, played by Erika Heynatz, made her first screen appearance on 25 June 2015. The character and casting was announced on 11 January 2015. Heynatz began filming on-set during the week commencing 12 January. Of her casting, Heynatz commented "Just like with any new job or new environment, there are always some nerves. But ultimately, I am really thrilled. It feels like the perfect timing, the perfect role and the character is going to be a lot of fun to play." Charlotte is a biology teacher, who joined the staff at the local high school. She later explained that Charlotte comes to Summer Bay for a fresh start, something that Haynatz related to, but would be hiding "a secret history". Debbie Schipp for news.com.au commented that Charlotte would not have a low key arrival, while Heynatz added "there's no slinking into the show in the background – she definitely makes an entrance." The character was killed off by Josh Barrett in the season finale on 9 December 2015.

James Edmunds

James Edmunds, played by Myles Pollard, made his first screen appearance on 9 July 2015. Pollard's casting was announced in March 2015. He previously appeared in Home and Away in 2007 as Dane Jordans. Of his workload this time around, Pollard said "The amount of scripts you have to learn daily is quite full on and also for me, playing a doctor and an academic, you have lots of exposition in the writing and a lot of that is jargon driven; lots of big words and only one or two takes to make it work."

James is a doctor and an associate professor. He was introduced as a love interest for established character Roo Stewart (Georgie Parker). Pollard explained that James was more of a challenge to play than Dane and would play an integral part in Roo's storyline. He commented, "He's an intelligent character and really cares for Roo and her family, he really values that relationship. He's more of a protagonist too, so he's driving the story more than the other character I played. It's more responsibility, which is nice." Emma Bergmeier-Varian from The West Australian described James as "charming and affable" and reported that he has a dark past, an aspect of the character Pollard enjoyed playing. He said that James had good intentions, but was flawed and complicated.

James comes to The Diner looking for his former school friend Roo Stewart, after they ran into each other at a conference. He offers her a teaching job at the university, before revealing that he is moving back to Summer Bay, as he has found work at the hospital. On Roo's first day at the university, James wishes her luck and later invites her out for coffee. They get on well and discuss their teaching methods. Roo then invites James to Casey Braxton's naming ceremony. They later go out on a proper date, but Roo acts strangely, prompting James to leave early. When he learns that she was nervous and had received some bad dating advice from her friends, he kisses her and they begin dating. They attend a dinner with Roo's friends and her father, Alf (Ray Meagher), who takes a dislike to James. James starts work at the local hospital and treats both Katarina Chapman (Pia Miller) and Marilyn Chambers (Emily Symons). James asks Roo and Maddy Osborne (Kassandra Clementi) to move in with him. James tells Roo that his parents will be attending their house warming party, but he later tells her they cannot make it.

Maddy becomes suspicions of James when she learns he has two phones, while Denny Miller (Jessica Grace Smith) remembers seeing him at the university with a young girl she assumed was his daughter. James proposes to Roo and she accepts. They try to get married quickly, but Alf stops the wedding after learning that there is no record of James having worked at the Blue Mountains Hospital. James assures Roo that he simply went by his middle name instead. James suffers burn injuries when he tries to stop an aerosol can from being thrown into a fire. At the hospital, Roo comes face to face with his wife Megan (Sophie Gregg) and learns that they have two children. James apologises for lying and Roo ends their engagement, but continues the relationship. After James admits that his parents are actually dead, she breaks up with him and tells him to get help.

Hunter King

Hunter King, played by Scott Lee, made his first screen appearance on 27 July 2015. Lee's casting was revealed when he appeared alongside the cast at the Logie Awards in May 2015. The role marks Lee's acting debut and he called it "very exciting". Lee described his character as being "angsty, brooding and moody". He added that Hunter would cause some trouble between some of the established couples within Summer Bay. Hunter is the son of Charlotte King (Erika Heynatz) and he follows her to the Bay, so he can finally meet his father Zac MacGuire (Charlie Clausen). In 2016, Lee confirmed that he would be leaving the show at the end of 2017 to pursue his acting career in the United States. Lee stated, "I'm excited. The times I've had has gone so quickly and I've learnt a lot as an actor."

Tank Snelgrove

Wayne "Tank" Snelgrove, played by Reece Milne, made his first screen appearance on 9 September 2015. Milne's casting and character details were confirmed on 5 September. He originally auditioned for the role of Hunter King, but Scott Lee was cast instead. One month later he was offered the role of Tank. Milne described his character as "every bad boy cliche rolled into one" and "cunning". He said Tank would have secrets, which intrigues Evelyn MacGuire (Philippa Northeast), who meets him on the beach. Tank departed the show in October 2015, but returned in April 2016. He was romantically linked into a relationship with Skye Peters, who is a friend of his ex-girlfriend, Evelyn. Tank departed on 2 June 2016 with Skye.

Tank accidentally bumps into Evelyn MacGuire on the beach. He apologises and tells her that he will see her around. They later run into each other at Angelo's and Tank asks Evie for her number. They later meet up for a date at the beach. Evie's ex-boyfriend, Josh Barrett (Jackson Gallagher) notices Tank and Evie together, and he tries to warn Evie off him. Tank and Evie spend more time together and consummate their relationship, but they forget to use protection. After spending the evening at his place, Evie questions Tank's commitment to her, after a comment from one of his friends. Tank flirts with Maddy Osborne (Kassandra Clementi), leading Evie to ask if they can slow their relationship down. Tank becomes angry and walks away. She later witnesses Tank arguing with Greg Snelgrove (Paul Gleeson) on the beach and Tank reveals that Greg is his father. He tells Evie that Greg is physically abusive towards him. Tank gets a tattoo with the letter "E" for Evelyn on his arm and they confess their love for each other. Evie's love for Tank gets stronger. Leah Patterson-Baker (Ada Nicodemou) confronts Greg about him abusing Tank but Greg says that he didn't do it and Tank is manipulative. At Maddy's 18th birthday party Tank wants to meet up with Evie but she doesn't want to leave the party so Tank brings a lot of his mates to Maddy's party.

They then trash the place leading one of them throwing an aerosol can into the fire which explodes and James Edmunds gets hurt. Leah and Zac MacGuire (Charlie Clausen) forbid Evie to see Tank. One night he sneaks into Evie's room and stays the night but is seen by VJ Patterson (Matt Little) as he leaves off the roof the following morning. Evie gets into trouble and Tank convinces her to runaway with him. They do and Evie's family is worried about where they are. Tank becomes aggressive and scares Evie who wants to leave but is prevented. She uses Tank's phone to send a map of where she is to Josh. Tank catches her and Evie runs away into the bush. Tank chases after her and Josh goes to the location of the map. He guesses that Evie is in the bush and it is confirmed by Tank's shouts that he will find her. Josh goes into the bush and finds her and brings her back home. He leaves Evie at home and tells her he will visit her that evening but while leaving the caravan park Tank runs up behind him and punches him in the back of the head leaving him unconscious and in a coma for a long time. Tank plants a fake note saying there is a bomb in his father's office and the HSC exam is stopped and the school is evacuated. Tank texts Evie saying if she doesn't come to him he will explode the 'bomb'. Evie finds him and Tank opens up about his past and his mother's death. They are found by police and Tank is arrested over the bomb hoax and Josh's punch.

A few months later, Greg learns Zac was in prison with Tank and that his son saved Zac when he was stabbed by a group of prisoners. Greg visits Tank and realises he has been beaten up by the same group of prisoners. When Zac also visits, one of the prisoners stabs Tank. He is taken to the hospital and treated by Doctor Anna Griffin (Pip Edwards). Josh comes to see Tank, who tries to apologise for what he did, but Josh attacks him when Tank mentions Evie's name. Evie also visits Tank and he tells her he has changed. Zac helps Tank get parole. While out jogging, Tank collapses in pain and Skye Peters (Marlo Kelly) helps him. After they spend the afternoon together, Skye invites Tank to a party that night. As they arrive, Josh attempts to attack Tank again and he leaves, as Skye realises who he is. She comes to find him and asks him about kidnapping Evie and punching Josh. The following day, VJ sees Skye and Tank together and he tells Tank to get away from Skye. When Tank tells Skye that they cannot hang out anymore, she kisses him. He asks her to come back to his place, but she tells him that kissing is a far as she is going, which he respects. VJ catches them kissing and Tank leaves. At the beach, Tank tells Skye that he thought that he and Evie would be together forever and Skye realises that he still loves Evie. Josh confronts Tank and tells him to stay from them. Josh's older brother, Andy Barrett (Tai Hara) also threatens Tank. Skye apologises for telling Evie about his feelings for her, and they continue to spend time together. Tank decides to attend a hospital fundraiser at the Caravan Park, but Andy Barrett follows him and they fight. They knock over some gas canisters, which are then ignited by a loose wire and cause an explosion, which kills Oscar and his aunt, Hannah Wilson (Cassie Howarth). Andy later finds an injured Tank wandering on the road and he is taken to the hospital. Tank is questioned by the police about the explosion and tells Skye that he caused the explosion that killed Oscar. Skye is furious and ends her friendship with Tank. Everyone finds out that Tank caused the explosion and Zac attacks Tank.

Greg knows Tank wasn't responsible and knows that his son was trying to protect someone. Tank tells Andy that he is going to hand himself in to the police. Tank is arrested for the explosion and killing Oscar and Hannah. But Tank is bailed, when Andy turns to the police. Skye knew about Tank protecting Andy and confronts Tank. He tells her and finds out that Skye told Evie, which angers him. He later reconciles with Skye. Skye's foster father, John Palmer (Shane Withington) is not happy with Tank and Skye's relationship. When Skye tells Tank that she is ready to sleep with him, he tries to be careful and make sure if Skye is really ready. They sleep together at Skye's house. Tank finds out that his father was offered a job in the city and wants Tank to come with him to start a new life, since the Bay doesn't give him a second chance. Skye decides to join him, but Greg refuses. Tank then leaves Summer Bay with Skye to start a new life together. A week later, Skye returns home to get her other belongings before heading off with Tank.

Trystan Powell

Trystan Powell, played by Ben Mingay, made his first screen appearance on 5 October 2015. The character and casting was announced in May 2015. Of his casting, Mingay said "It's awesome news, I'm thrilled to be working on a show that has great value, a strong storyline and is well shot."

Mingay described Trystan as "a dark and shady character", while The Daily Telegraph's Matt Bamford commented that he was "tempestuous" and would cause trouble in Summer Bay. Mingay later told Gavin Scott from TV Week that he relished the chance to play a villain, as he had mostly portrayed funny characters before. He commented, "The go-to for a lot of guys portraying villains is to be scary, but I tried to be a bit more calculating." He also branded his character "a shark in a suit", as he is well turned out. The actor revealed that Trystan would be interacting with Charlotte King (Erika Heynatz), saying that would cause "a massive headache" for her.

Trystan begins watching Charlotte King and sends her a note revealing that he knows she murdered Denny Miller (Jessica Grace Smith). When he learns that Charlotte is planning on leaving the Bay he sabotages her car to stop her. He blackmails Charlotte into giving him $100,000. It soon emerges that Trystan is working for Trevor Gunson (Diarmid Heidenreich) who believes Darryl Braxton (Steve Peacocke) has faked his death. Trystan forces Charlotte to get close to the people in Brax's life, starting with his half-brother Kyle Braxton (Nic Westaway). When Kyle sees Trystan arguing with Charlotte, she tells him that he has been blackmailing her, so Kyle attacks him. This only angers Trystan, who threatens to hurt someone close to Charlotte. He then has her son Hunter (Scott Lee) kidnapped and dumped in the bush. Charlotte meets with Trystan in her car at the side of a road and begs him to stop coming after her. After he makes it clear that he has no intention of backing down, Charlotte runs him down with her car. Trystan suffers serious internal injuries and dies the following day.

Skye Peters

Skye Peters, played by Marlo Kelly, made her first screen appearance on 19 November 2015. The role marked Kelly's acting breakthrough. Her character was introduced as Jett James's (Will McDonald) girlfriend. In April 2016, Sophie Dainty of Digital Spy reported Skye would have a "controversial" relationship with reformed "bad boy" Tank Snelgrove (Reece Milne), causing some of the locals to worry about her. The character made her final appearance on 9 June 2016.

In 2022, the show's former script executive Dan Bennett revealed Skye was supposed to be featured in the show for three years. He cancelled the character's stories and Kelly left the show. Bennett explained via Twitter that "Skye was meant to be a 3 year player; I canned her after her initial 13 weeks because (that poor girl) they cast someone geometrical different to what the story required."

Jett James invites Skye to Summer Bay to meet his father John Palmer (Shane Withington). Skye tells John that she has run away from her mother, as she blames Skye for the death of her sister Lisa in a car accident. John decides to speak with Skye's mother, causing her to run off. After talking with Leah Patterson-Baker (Ada Nicodemou), Skye agrees to go with John to see her mother. Shortly after arriving, Christian Thomas (Harry Turnbull O'Brien) walks past and tells Jett and John that Skye is a liar. Skye explains to John that she befriended Christian and started making things up to keep his attention, but she is not lying about her mother's behaviour towards her. Skye's mother Carol (Caroline Brazier) apologises for how she has been treating her. After John and Jett leave, Carol locks Skye in her bedroom. Skye escapes through a window and returns to John's house. She befriends Oscar MacGuire (Jake Speer), whom she tried to help him get over his ex-girlfriend, Maddy Osborne (Kassandra Clementi). When John was out, leaving Skye at home alone, Carol turns up and tries to take Skye home. Skye tries to escape, but Carol grabs her and held her hostage. Carol continues to blame Skye for Lisa's death and Oscar barged into the house and rescues Skye from her mother. Carol was taken away by the police and was placed in a psychiatric facility. Skye decided to move in with her aunt, who lives in Adelaide, but instead, John invites Skye to live with him and his wife Marilyn (Emily Symons), Skye accepts his offer and John fosters her. Skye visits Carol in a psychiatric facility, accompanied by Oscar. When Jett breaks up with Skye and she worries that John will ask her to leave, but he wants her to stay. After Marilyn breaks her leg while she is in Italy, John flies out to look after her. He asks Irene Roberts (Lynne McGranger) to take Skye in.

Olivia Fraser Richards (Raechelle Banno) takes an instant dislike to Skye, who badmouths about her behind her back. Olivia's boyfriend, Hunter King (Scott Lee) invites Skye to his basketball practice and there she befriends Billie Ashford, who watches the basketball game. Skye breaks up the fight between Hunter and his stepbrother, VJ Patterson (Matt Little), who blames Hunter for burning his old house. That night, Hunter forced Olivia to apologise to Skye. Olivia apologises to Skye, who forgives her and they become friends. Oscar invites Skye to Angelo's and she assumes it is a date, but she finds him kissing another girl on the balcony and leaves. Skye and VJ sneak into a university party at Angelo's and she becomes jealous when she sees Oscar with another girl. After VJ got drunk, Billie takes Skye and VJ out of the party. Skye and Oscar briefly fall out when she tells his date that he was with another girl earlier during the party. Skye comforts and supports Olivia, after her break-up with Hunter, who cheated on her with Lindsay Ford (Georgia Flood). VJ invites Skye and Olivia to the beach, where Lindsay and her friends held a party there. Skye accidentally confess her feelings towards Oscar to Olivia out loud, which Lindsay and her friends overheard and mocks her. Skye stood up for herself and tells Lindsay that she isn't a horrible person. Skye and VJ stopped Olivia from slapping Lindsay at the Diner, who annoyed her, while Olivia was working.

When Oscar tries to ask her out, Skye tells him that she is no longer interested in him after finding out that his sister, Evelyn MacGuire (Philippa Northeast), knew about Skye's crush on him. Skye asks VJ to teach her to surf, and Billie steps in to help. Skye realises VJ has a crush on Billie and agrees to pretend to be his girlfriend to make Billie jealous. However, when VJ kisses her, she pushes him away and they agree to end the pretence. Skye supports Olivia when she learns she is pregnant. Skye helps Tank Snelgrove when he collapses at the beach. Skye invites Tank to a party at Angelo's, but soon learns he is Evie's ex-boyfriend, who kidnaps her and later coward-punches Evie's fiancé, Josh Barrett (Jackson Gallagher). Tank tells Skye that his time in prison has changed him and Skye believes him. She spends more time with him, despite warnings from VJ and Oscar. When Tank tells Skye they cannot spend any more time together, she kisses him. VJ later caught them kissing. Evie later tells Skye to be careful, as she does not want her to go through the same ordeal. Olivia also voices her concerns. Skye realises Tank still loves Evie and accidentally tells her, making things difficult for Tank. He forgives Skye and they continue to spend time together. Skye learns Tank is responsible for the explosion at the Caravan Park that killed Oscar and Hannah Wilson (Cassie Howarth) and ends her friendship with him.

Skye attends to Oscar and Hannah's funeral. At the wake, Skye tells Olivia and Hunter that Tank killed Oscar and Hannah. Hunter immediately tell his father, Zac MacGuire (Charlie Clausen), and Evie. Skye tells everyone what Tank told her. However, Skye knows he is protecting someone and confronts him to tell her the truth, or he'll never see her again. Tank tells her that it was Josh's brother, Andy Barrett (Tai Hara), who caused the explosion and killed Oscar and Hannah, and Skye accidentally tells Evie, which angers Tank, but they reconcile. Skye tells Tank that she's ready to sleep with him; Skye later loses her virginity to Tank. Skye tells Olivia about her first time. Tank and Skye are caught together at the beach by Chris Harrington (Johnny Ruffo), who informs John, who is furious about Skye seeing Tank and tells her to stay away. Skye finds out from Tank that his father, Greg, had offered a job in the city, which leads Tank to leave the bay with him. Skye decides to join Tank, but Greg refuses. Skye and Tank decide to leave the Bay together. Skye says goodbye to Olivia and leaves a farewell letter to John. Skye then leaves Summer Bay with Tank to start a new life together. A week later, Skye returns to the Bay to pick up her other belongings and John finds her in the house. John asks her to stay, but she declines, saying that she wants to be with Tank. John accepts this to let her go. He gives her a photo of him and Skye so she can remember him. Skye takes her bags and leaves Summer Bay with Tank, but leaves the photo of her and John behind. A few days later, Roo Stewart (Georgie Parker) tells John that Skye and Tank have moved to the city with Greg. Greg promises John that he will keep an eye on Skye for him.

Others

References

External links
Characters and cast at the Official Home and Away website
Characters and cast at the Internet Movie Database

, 2015
Home and Away